The Goldried Quintett were an Austrian Volksmusik group from Matrei in Osttirol. The group was founded by Roland Mühlburger in 1980, and lasted until December 31, 2012 when the group disbanded. The Goldried quintet has achieved six gold, and two platinum records along with the Oberkrainer Award which was won in 2012.

Achievements

Gold

Der Paul und sein Gaul (Paul and his horse)
Wir bleibm Landsleut
Mei liabes Spatzerl
Am Sonntag gehn ma Radl fahrn
Bist mein Schatz
Komm doch mit um die Welt

Platinum

Der Paul und sein Gaul (Paul and his horse)
Wir bleibm Landsleut

References

German folk music
German folk music groups
Musical groups established in 1980
Musical groups disestablished in 2012